Die Kinder vom Alstertal is a German children's television series produced by Norddeutscher Rundfunk and  broadcast on the Kinderkanal from 1998 to 2004. There are 52 episodes in four seasons.

Series
The series is set in a large farmhouse near the North Sea with a station on the Hamburg U-Bahn. The main characters are seven children from three families living together in the house, and the series also features assorted animals, in particular the farm dog, Oskar, the farm cats, a tame rooster, Einstein, and a pony, Justus. It was a successor to Neues vom Süderhof, with the same director, and Ursula Hinrichs, the grandmother in the former series, playing an aunt. Scriptwriters were Marlies Kerremans, Jörn Schröder and Horst Peter Lommer, with Arno Alexander as editor. Die Kinder vom Alstertal aimed to be more realistic and somewhat more complex than its predecessor.

Filming took place near Soltau at the Menkenhof.

Main cast
Ami: Ursula Hinrichs	
Babsi: Sonja Farke	
Carla: Simone Ritscher	
Cosima: Alessa Grimm	
Hexe: Marleen Lohse	
Kiki: Thuy-Anh Cao	
Lisa: Katharina Wäschenbach	
Susi: Kerstin Draeger	
Timo: Marco Soumikh	
Tobias: Tim Küchler	
Uwe: Lennardt Krüger

References

External links
 

1998 German television series debuts
2004 German television series endings
German children's television series
German-language television shows